Valdis Ģīlis (born 1954) is a Latvian politician and was a Deputy of the 9th Saeima. He is a member of the People's Party.

References

1954 births
Living people
Politicians from Riga
People's Party (Latvia) politicians
Deputies of the 7th Saeima
Deputies of the 8th Saeima
Deputies of the 9th Saeima
Riga Stradiņš University alumni
Date of birth missing (living people)